This page is a list of all players who have won the men's UEFA European Championship tournament since its inception in 1960.

Winning players 
A total of 322 players have been in the winning team in the European Championship. Only 13 players have been in the winning team twice, with Rainer Bonhof being the only non-Spanish to do so.

In the below table, years in bold indicate that the player appeared in the respective final where his team won, while years in italics indicate that the player was an unused squad member in the respective tournament.

By year 
In the below table, players highlighted in bold appeared in the respective finals, while players highlighted in italics were unused squad members in the respective tournaments.

See also 
 UEFA European Championship
 List of UEFA European Championship finals
 List of players who have appeared in multiple UEFA European Championships
 List of UEFA European Championship winning managers

References 

Squad lists

Player profiles

FIFA World Cup winning players
Association football player non-biographical articles
Lists of champion association football players
UEFA European Championship-winning players